Jamil Elshebli (born 9 April 1979) is a Paralympian athlete from Jordan competing mainly in category F57 shot put events but also in the powerlifting.

He competed in the 2004 Summer Paralympics where he won a silver in the shot put, he followed this up in the 2008 Summer Paralympics in Beijing, China where he won a second silver medal in the men's F57-58 shot put event. In the 2016 Summer Paralympics in Rio de Janeiro, Brazil he won bronze medal in the men's +107 kg powerlifting. In the 2020 Summer Paralympics in tokyo, Japan he won the gold medal in the men's +107 kg powerlifting.

See also
 List of IPC world records in athletics
 Jordan at the 2008 Summer Paralympics
 Jordan at the Paralympics
 List of 2008 Summer Paralympics medal winners
 Athletics at the 2010 Asian Para Games
 Athletics at the 2011 Pan Arab Games
 2008 Summer Paralympics national flag bearers

External links
 

Paralympic athletes of Jordan
Athletes (track and field) at the 2004 Summer Paralympics
Athletes (track and field) at the 2008 Summer Paralympics
Athletes (track and field) at the 2012 Summer Paralympics
Powerlifters at the 2016 Summer Paralympics
Paralympic silver medalists for Jordan
Paralympic bronze medalists for Jordan
Living people
1979 births
Medalists at the 2004 Summer Paralympics
Medalists at the 2008 Summer Paralympics
Medalists at the 2016 Summer Paralympics
Medalists at the 2020 Summer Paralympics
Paralympic medalists in athletics (track and field)
Powerlifters at the 2020 Summer Paralympics
Jordanian male shot putters
Paralympic powerlifters of Jordan
Medalists at the 2010 Asian Para Games
21st-century Jordanian people